Acanthops is a genus of mantises in the family Acanthopidae, containing 20 species that can be found in Central and South America.

Description 
Most species in Acanthops are colloquially referred to as the dead leaf mantis, a common name also used for species in several other mantid genera. The genus name translates from the Greek nouns ἄκανθα and ὅψ as "thorn eye", referring to the presence in all Acanthops species of a shorter or longer conical tubercle on top of each eye. Note that such ocular tubercles also occur in various other mantid genera.

Acanthops species have an unusual degree of sexual dimorphism compared to other mantids. The flightless female resembles a curled dead leaf folded back on itself, and weighs twice as much as the males do. It has reduced wings that can be raised to reveal bright warning colors on the abdomen. The male has long functional wings that resemble a flat or rolled-up dead leaf at rest. When perched, males often assume a posture where the head, grasping legs and prothorax add to the camouflage effect by recreating the appearance of a dead leaf's shriveled petiole and stipules.

Taxonomy 
The following species are currently considered valid:

Acanthops bidens Hebard, 1922
Acanthops boliviana Chopard, 1916
Acanthops brunneri Saussure, 1871
Acanthops centralis Lombardo & Ippolito, 2004
Acanthops coloradensis González, Miller & J Salazar, 2011
Acanthops contorta Gerstaecker, 1889
Acanthops elegans Lombardo & Ippolito, 2004
Acanthops erosa Serville, 1839
Acanthops erosula Stal, 1877
Acanthops falcata Stal, 1877
Acanthops falcataria (Goeze, 1778)
Acanthops fuscifolia (Olivier, 1792)
Acanthops godmani Saussure & Zehntner, 1894
Acanthops occidentalis Lombardo & Ippolito, 2004
Acanthops onorei Lombardo & Ippolito, 2004
Acanthops parafalcata Lombardo & Ippolito, 2004
Acanthops parva Beier, 1941
Acanthops royi Lombardo & Ippolito, 2004
Acanthops soukana Roy, 2002

See also
List of mantis genera and species

References

External links 
Acanthops entry in Mantodea Species File website
Acanthops images at Project Noah

Acanthopidae
Mantodea of South America
Mantodea genera
Taxa named by Jean Guillaume Audinet-Serville